The 2020 season was the Tennessee Titans' 51st in the National Football League (NFL), their 61st overall, their 24th in the state of Tennessee, and their third under head coach Mike Vrabel. After starting the season 5–0, their first since the 2008 season, the Titans improved upon their 9–7 season from the previous 4 years and earned their first double-digit winning season and division title since 2008. The Titans finished tied with the Indianapolis Colts for the AFC South division title, but won the tiebreaker based on record vs. division opponents (5–1 to 4–2). In the Wild Card round, the Titans lost to the Baltimore Ravens 20–13.

Titans running back and Associated Press NFL Offensive Player of the Year Derrick Henry rushed for 2,000 yards in 2020, making him the second Tennessee Titan to do so, after Chris Johnson; this also made the Titans the first team in league history to have multiple members in the 2,000-yard club.

Offseason

Coaching changes
Titans defensive coordinator Dean Pees retired on January 20, 2020, after spending the last two seasons with the team. On the same day, it was announced that secondary coach Kerry Coombs would be leaving to rejoin the coaching staff at Ohio State. On January 28, 2020, the Titans hired Anthony Midget to replace Coombs as secondary coach. On February 6, 2020, former New Orleans Saints and St. Louis Rams head coach Jim Haslett was hired to be the inside linebackers coach for the Titans. Head coach Mike Vrabel decided not to hire a defensive coordinator for the season. Following the Titans' 20–13 defeat against the Baltimore Ravens in the Wild Card round of the playoffs, Vrabel revealed that outside linebackers coach Shane Bowen was defensive coordinator in all but title, and that Bowen made the defensive play calls.

Roster changes

Reserve/future free agent contracts

Source:

Free agents

Departures

Draft

Undrafted free agents

Source:

Staff

Final roster

Team captains
Ryan Tannehill (QB)
Derrick Henry (RB)
DaQuan Jones (NT)
Kevin Byard (FS)
Brett Kern (P)

Source:

Preseason
The Titans' preseason schedule was announced on May 7, but was later cancelled due to the COVID-19 pandemic.

Regular season

Schedule
The Titans' 2020 schedule was announced on May 7.

Note: Intra-division opponents are in bold text.

Game summaries

Week 1: at Denver Broncos

Week 2: vs. Jacksonville Jaguars

Week 3: at Minnesota Vikings

Stephen Gostkowski kicked a career-high 6 field goals, including 3 from 50+ yards, as the Titans would win another close game against the Vikings.

Week 5: vs. Buffalo Bills

The Titans ended an unplanned two-week hiatus and a three-game losing streak to the Bills, their most recent previous win coming in a 35-34 win at Buffalo in 2012.  Ryan Tannehill exceeded 100 in passer rating (129.3) for the second time to date in the season.

Week 6: vs. Houston Texans

The former Houston Oilers reached 5-0 for the second time in club history in what to that point was the highest-scoring (78 combined points) and most competitive game in their sibling-esque rivalry with the present day NFL club of Houston. Behind four Deshaun Watson scores, the Texans erased an early 14-point deficit to lead 36-29 late in the fourth quarter, but Ryan Tannehill completed eight straight passes, ending in a seven-yard touchdown to A. J. Brown, to tie the game in the final seconds of the fourth quarter. In overtime, the Titans advanced 82 yards on six plays and Derrick Henry scored on a direct snap play to win the game 42–36. The Titans' 607 total yards of offense were the most of any team all season.

Week 7: vs. Pittsburgh Steelers

The game was originally scheduled for Sunday, October 4 at 1:00 p.m. but was postponed due to the Titans and Minnesota Vikings suspending in-person team activities due to several positive COVID-19 tests from Tennessee in the aftermath of the Titans–Vikings game.

The Titans rallied back after falling behind 27–7, scoring 17 unanswered points in the 3rd and 4th quarters. However, with 19 seconds left in the 4th quarter, kicker Stephen Gostkowski missed what would have been a game-tying 45-yard field goal to send the game into overtime, sealing the Titans' first loss of the season and extending their losing streak against the Steelers to three games, dating back to Week 11 of the 2014 season.

Week 8: at Cincinnati Bengals

The Titans suffered their fifth loss to the Bengals in nine meetings since the two teams were split out of the former AFC Central in 2002.

Week 9: vs. Chicago Bears

The Titans ended their two-game slide by edging the Bears (the team where their former head coach Jeff Fisher both played and began his coaching career) despite being limited to 228 yards of total offense. Ryan Tannehill completed just ten of 21 passes but two were touchdowns including a spirited 40-yard score to A. J. Brown. Desmond King also scored when he recovered a fumble and ran in 63 yards.

Week 10: vs. Indianapolis Colts

The Colts scored on a 24-yard drive following a poor Titans punt then scored again on a blocked punt.  This was Indianapolis’ third straight win at Nissan Stadium.

Week 11: at Baltimore Ravens

In what turned out to be a playoff preview, the Titans rallied to beat the Ravens in overtime in a game in which the referees had to break up a pregame argument between Ravens head coach John Harbaugh and Titans cornerback Malcolm Butler; a similar scenario occurred involving Harbaugh and Mike Vrabel. Mark Andrews’ 31-yard score put Baltimore up 21–10, but two Stephen Gostkowski field goals (the second came after Lamar Jackson was intercepted at the Titans' 9-yard line) were followed by a bulling 14-yard touchdown catch by A. J. Brown and a Ryan Tannehill two-point run to give Tennessee the lead, 24–21. Jackson threw for 48 yards and rushed for 22 for the game-tying field goal, but in overtime, Tannehill completed three passes for 36 yards before Derrick Henry tore through for the 29-yard touchdown to seal the game, 30–24.

Week 12: at Indianapolis Colts

The Titans won at Lucas Oil Stadium for the third time in four trips leading wire to wire against the Colts and reaching eight wins. Derrick Henry erupted to three rushing  touchdowns (the first on a lateral from Ryan Tannehill) in the first half, becoming the first player with the club with three rushing scores since Lorenzo White ran in four touchdowns against the Browns in the club's days as the Houston Oilers. A. J. Brown caught a touchdown and also scored when he caught an onside kick by the Colts.

The win marked only the third time in the history of the AFC South (and first time in consecutive seasons) that the road team in the Colts-Titans rivalry won both games.

Week 13: vs. Cleveland Browns

The Titans faced Baker Mayfield for the second ever time and the ensuing game became one of the most bitterly fought in the rivalry between the two teams.  A failed fourth down run by Derrick Henry and a fumble led to an early 17–0 Browns lead; Mayfield threw four touchdowns in the first half as the Browns led 38–7.  The Titans outscored the Browns 28–3 in the second half but failed on an onside kick in the final thirty seconds.

Week 14: at Jacksonville Jaguars

Week 15: vs. Detroit Lions

The Titans cruised to a victory over the Lions to earn their tenth win of the season, ending their streak of four straight 9–7 seasons, and earning their first double-digit win season since 2008.

Week 16: at Green Bay Packers

In a snowstorm, Packers head coach Matt LaFleur defeated the Titans in his first meeting with them since leaving the organization in 2019 to become the new head coach of the Packers. LaFleur had served as offensive coordinator for the Titans during the 2018 season. Though the Titans rushed for 156 yards, Ryan Tannehill completed just eleven passes for 124 yards.

Week 17: at Houston Texans

After combining for 78 points in their first meeting Houston and Tennessee topped that with 79 points in the regular season finale.  Derrick Henry reached 2,000 yards and set the team record for rushing yards in a season and had two scores, but the Texans rallied from down 24–9 to take a 35–31 lead in the fourth quarter.  Ryan Tannehill led a 19-play drive encompassing 8:32 and Tannehill ran in a five-yard score (after a quarterback sneak score was erased on a penalty).  Deshaun Watson led the Texans to the Tennessee 38 but had to settle for a field goal.  With only eighteen seconds to work with Tannehill completed a 52-yard strike to A. J. Brown; a four-yard run to the Houston 19 set up the winning field goal by newly signed kicker Samuel Sloman; the kick bounced off the upright and bounced in.

With the win, the Titans swept the Texans for the first time since 2007, and secured a playoff berth as the AFC South division winner for the first time since 2008. In the playoffs, they would host a home game in the Wild Card round against the Baltimore Ravens, whom they beat earlier in the season.

Standings

Division

Conference

Postseason

Schedule

Game summaries

AFC Wild Card Playoffs: vs. (5) Baltimore Ravens

The Titans faced the Ravens in a rematch of their Week 11 regular season game (which the Titans won). Although they took an early 10–0 lead, the Ravens rallied to score 17 unanswered points. Derrick Henry, who led the NFL in rushing yards, was held to just 40 yards rushing on 18 carries. With the Titans trailing 20–13 late, Tannehill's pass intended for Kalif Raymond was intercepted by Marcus Peters; in a reversal of the regular season game, the Ravens players celebrated by dancing on the Titans' logo at midfield.

Notes

References

External links
 

Tennessee
Tennessee Titans seasons
Tennessee Titans
AFC South championship seasons